Call of Duty: My Life Before, During, and After the Band of Brothers is the title of Lt. Lynn Compton's  memoirs. Buck was made famous by the popular HBO World War II miniseries, Band of Brothers, by the book of the same title by historian Stephen Ambrose, and his involvement in Sirhan Sirhan's trial for the murder of Robert F. Kennedy.

Published by Berkley Publishing, it was released on May 6, 2008, and features an epilogue by Neal McDonough.

Notes

External links
Buck Compton's Book Blog
Marcus Brotherton's Blog
Google eBook

2008 non-fiction books
American memoirs